No. 277 Squadron RAF was a Royal Air Force Squadron formed as an air-sea rescue unit in World War II.

History

Formation in World War II

The squadron formed at Stapleford Tawney on 22 December 1941 equipped with the Westland Lysander and Supermarine Walrus. Boulton Paul Defiants and Supermarine Spitfires were then supplied for spotting downed aircrew in the English Channel.

The Vickers Warwick which could drop lifeboats was operated from November 1944 and the squadron was able to increase its area of operations with a detachment based at RAF Portreath. The squadron was disbanded On 15 February 1945.

Aircraft operated

References

External links

 History of No.'s 276–280 Squadrons at RAF Web
 277 Squadron history on the official RAF website

277
Military units and formations established in 1941